Bioley-Orjulaz is a former municipality in the district of Gros-de-Vaud in the canton of Vaud in Switzerland. On 1 July 2021 it merged into the municipality of Assens.

History
Orjulaz is first mentioned in the 12th Century as Oriola.  In 1516, Bioley-Orjulaz was mentioned as Biolley orjeux.

Geography
Of this area,  or 70.4% is used for agricultural purposes, while  or 17.7% is forested.

Of the built up area, industrial buildings made up 1.9% of the total area while housing and buildings made up 2.9% and transportation infrastructure made up 2.9%.  Power and water infrastructure as well as other special developed areas made up 2.9% of the area  Out of the forested land, all of the forested land area is covered with heavy forests.  Of the agricultural land, 60.1% is used for growing crops and 8.7% is pastures, while 1.6% is used for orchards or vine crops.  All the water in the municipality is flowing water.

The former municipality was part of the Echallens District until it was dissolved on 31 August 2006, and Bioley-Orjulaz became part of the new district of Gros-de-Vaud.

The former municipality is located in the Gros-de-Vaud area.

Coat of arms
The blazon of the municipal coat of arms is Or, on a bend Gules three birch leaves of the first bendwise.

Demographics
Bioley-Orjulaz had a population of 520. , 14.9% of the population are resident foreign nationals.  Over the last 10 years (1999–2009 ) the population has changed at a rate of 41.5%.  It has changed at a rate of 37.7% due to migration and at a rate of 4.2% due to births and deaths.

Most of the population speaks French (268 or 93.1%), with German being second most common (7 or 2.4%) and Spanish being third (4 or 1.4%).  There is 1 person who speaks Italian.

Of the population in the municipality 95 or about 33.0% were born in Bioley-Orjulaz and lived there in 2000.  There were 112 or 38.9% who were born in the same canton, while 48 or 16.7% were born somewhere else in Switzerland, and 32 or 11.1% were born outside of Switzerland.

In  there were 7 live births to Swiss citizens and 1 death of a Swiss citizen and 1 non-Swiss citizen death.  Ignoring immigration and emigration, the population of Swiss citizens increased by 6 while the foreign population decreased by 1.  At the same time, there were 3 non-Swiss men who immigrated from another country to Switzerland.  The total Swiss population change in 2008 (from all sources, including moves across municipal borders) was a decrease of 18 and the non-Swiss population increased by 5 people.  This represents a population growth rate of -3.8%.

The age distribution, in Bioley-Orjulaz is; 51 children or 12.5% of the population are between 0 and 9 years old and 48 teenagers or 11.7% are between 10 and 19.  Of the adult population, 50 people or 12.2% of the population are between 20 and 29 years old.  88 people or 21.5% are between 30 and 39, 69 people or 16.9% are between 40 and 49, and 44 people or 10.8% are between 50 and 59.  The senior population distribution is 29 people or 7.1% of the population are between 60 and 69 years old, 17 people or 4.2% are between 70 and 79, there are 12 people or 2.9% who are between 80 and 89, and there is 1 person who is 90 and older.

, there were 110 people who were single and never married in the municipality.  There were 153 married individuals, 8 widows or widowers and 17 individuals who are divorced.

, there were 112 private households in the municipality, and an average of 2.6 persons per household.  There were 26 households that consist of only one person and 5 households with five or more people.  Out of a total of 113 households that answered this question, 23.0% were households made up of just one person.  Of the rest of the households, there are 34 married couples without children, 46 married couples with children  There were 6 single parents with a child or children.

 there were 34 single family homes (or 49.3% of the total) out of a total of 69 inhabited buildings.  There were 17 multi-family buildings (24.6%), along with 10 multi-purpose buildings that were mostly used for housing (14.5%) and 8 other use buildings (commercial or industrial) that also had some housing (11.6%).  Of the single family homes 7 were built before 1919, while 4 were built between 1990 and 2000.  The greatest number of single family homes (18) were built between 1981 and 1990.  The most multi-family homes (8) were built before 1919 and the next most (6) were built between 1981 and 1990.  There was 1 multi-family house built between 1996 and 2000.

 there were 118 apartments in the municipality.  The most common apartment size was 4 rooms of which there were 37.  There were 5 single room apartments and 38 apartments with five or more rooms.  Of these apartments, a total of 110 apartments (93.2% of the total) were permanently occupied, while 8 apartments (6.8%) were seasonally occupied.  , the construction rate of new housing units was 58.7 new units per 1000 residents.  The vacancy rate for the municipality, was 0%.

The historical population is given in the following chart:

Politics
In the 2007 federal election the most popular party was the SVP which received 29.51% of the vote.  The next three most popular parties were the FDP (22.15%), the Green Party (12.43%) and the CVP (12.07%).  In the federal election, a total of 115 votes were cast, and the voter turnout was 47.7%.

Economy
, Bioley-Orjulaz had an unemployment rate of 4.6%.  , there were 11 people employed in the primary economic sector and about 5 businesses involved in this sector.  213 people were employed in the secondary sector and there were 10 businesses in this sector.  32 people were employed in the tertiary sector, with 8 businesses in this sector.  There were 142 residents of the municipality who were employed in some capacity, of which females made up 42.3% of the workforce.

 the total number of full-time equivalent jobs was 241.  The number of jobs in the primary sector was 9, all of which were in agriculture.  The number of jobs in the secondary sector was 207 of which 16 or (7.7%) were in manufacturing and 185 (89.4%) were in construction.  The number of jobs in the tertiary sector was 25.  In the tertiary sector; 9 or 36.0% were in wholesale or retail sales or the repair of motor vehicles, 12 or 48.0% were in the movement and storage of goods, 1 was in the information industry, 1 was a technical professional or scientist.

, there were 117 workers who commuted into the municipality and 114 workers who commuted away.  The municipality is a net importer of workers, with about 1.0 workers entering the municipality for every one leaving.  Of the working population, 6.3% used public transportation to get to work, and 75.4% used a private car.

Religion
Of the rest of the population, there were 5 members of an Orthodox church (or about 1.74% of the population), and there were 16 individuals (or about 5.56% of the population) who belonged to another Christian church. There were 4 individuals who belonged to another church.  16 (or about 5.56% of the population) belonged to no church, are agnostic or atheist, and 9 individuals (or about 3.13% of the population) did not answer the question.

Education
In Bioley-Orjulaz about 114 or (39.6%) of the population have completed non-mandatory upper secondary education, and 31 or (10.8%) have completed additional higher education (either university or a Fachhochschule).  Of the 31 who completed tertiary schooling, 51.6% were Swiss men, 38.7% were Swiss women.

In the 2009/2010 school year there were a total of 55 students in the Bioley-Orjulaz school district.  In the Vaud cantonal school system, two years of non-obligatory pre-school are provided by the political districts.  During the school year, the political district provided pre-school care for a total of 296 children of which 96 children (32.4%) received subsidized pre-school care.  The canton's primary school program requires students to attend for four years.  There were 28 students in the municipal primary school program.  The obligatory lower secondary school program lasts for six years and there were 26 students in those schools.  There were also 1 students who were home schooled or attended another non-traditional school.

, there were 14 students in Bioley-Orjulaz who came from another municipality, while 47 residents attended schools outside the municipality.

References

Former municipalities of the canton of Vaud